Homoenolates are a type of functional group that have been used in synthetic organic chemistry since the 1980s. They are related to enolates, but represent an umpolung of their reactivity. Homoenolates can be formed with a variety of different metal counterions, including lithium, iron, silver, lead, titanium, tin, tellurium, zirconium, niobium, mercury, zinc, antimony, bismuth, nickel, palladium, and copper. Homoenolates stability and reactivity varies by counterion identity and other nearby functional groups. Common pathways of decomposition include proto-demetalation and beta-hydride elimination. Multiple reviews on the topic of homoenolates and their reactivity have been published.

References

Organic chemistry